Loma Lynn Rowlinson (formerly Mathias), known professionally as Loma Lyns, is a Canadian singer-songwriter and television personality.

Career 
Her single "Red Handed" was a Top 40 hit on the Canadian country charts in 1990, and her single "Countin' on You This Time" was a Top 40 hit in Europe. She also had chart success in 1998 with "Love Me, I'm Alive", the theme song for the Canadian Special Olympics which she co-wrote with Chuck Labelle. She has shared the stage with many country music celebrities, has appeared on CBC, CTV and performed on the last season of the Tommy Hunter Show as an upcoming artist and also sang back-up for country superstar Colin Raye. She has performed at festivals and clubs across Canada and into the U.S. In the early 90s her music video "Who's the Stranger" garnered airtime on Canada's CMT.

A Whitefish Lake Ojibway from Northern Ontario, Canada, Loma has also been a host of television programming on the Aboriginal Peoples Television Network, and co-host of the hit series "Cooking With the Wolfman" and was for years the host of the documentary series "Aboriginal Voices".

Honors 
In 2017 she was inducted into the Northern Ontario Opry Hall of Fame.

Personal 
Loma and her husband are parents of eight children, and have been foster parents of a number of First Nations children. They reside in the region of the Greater City of Sudbury, Ontario. Loma continues to write and co-write music and still performs live on stage a few times a year.

Discography

Albums

Singles

References

External links
 Loma Lyns

Canadian women country singers
Canadian country singer-songwriters
Canadian television hosts
Canadian women television hosts
Ojibwe people
Living people
First Nations musicians
People from Sudbury District
Year of birth missing (living people)
20th-century Canadian women singers
First Nations women singers